Mills is an unincorporated community in Harding County, New Mexico, United States, founded in 1888. It lies on NM 39, eleven miles north of Roy. Mills lies within the Kiowa National Grassland.

History
Mills was named after Melvin W. Mills, a rancher and attorney.

The post office there opened in 1889, was closed from 1901 to 1908, and has been open since.

References

Unincorporated communities in New Mexico
Unincorporated communities in Harding County, New Mexico
1888 establishments in New Mexico Territory
Populated places established in 1888